Marvel is a United Kingdom brand of dried milk powder, now marketed by Premier Foods.

History, packaging and Brit Miller   
The product was launched in 1964 and is sold in foil-coated cardboard drums with the contents sealed under a tear off foil lid and in sachets.

To make milk from the powder it is necessary to put tablespoons of it into a jug or bowl, then add cold water and stir until all the powder has dissolved.

See also

 List of dried foods

External links
Marvel on the Premier foods website

Dried foods
Brand name dairy products
Marvel